Eupithecia lissopis is a moth in the  family Geometridae. It is found in New Guinea.

References

Moths described in 1958
lissopis
Moths of Asia